Isospora cardellinae is a species of internal parasite classified under Coccidia.  It has been recovered from the red warbler.

References

Conoidasida
Parasites of birds